Christina Johnston is an English coloratura soprano. Born in Framlingham, Suffolk, and educated at Framlingham College, she has sung leading roles, notably, at the Prague State Opera, including the Queen of the Night in Mozart's The Magic Flute. She has sung before various heads of state, including Miloš Zeman, President of the Czech Republic, and Xi Jinping, General Secretary of the Chinese Communist Party.

Early life
When Johnston was three, she and her mother Gillian were involved in a car crash while heading for Amberfield School, near Ipswich. Johnston can still recall her mother being cut out of the automobile and resuscitated in the ambulance on the way to hospital, where her injuries kept her for five months. Johnston herself spent three weeks in the same hospital with a broken left leg and numerous cuts on her head, and returned for further surgery six months later.

During this time, Johnston became close to her father, Peter, who taught her piano and guitar and had her sing harmony with him as he played. However, he died unexpectedly when she was eleven. In 2019, Johnston she wrote him a vocal tribute entitled "Learning to Breathe", recorded at a Meerkat Midnight Session and available on YouTube. Johnston also credits her father with her devout Christianity.

From 2010–2012, Johnston studied as a young artist at Narodni Divadlo.

Musical education
Johnston attended the Guildhall School of Music and Drama in London when she turned 18, having been offered a scholarship immediately after her first audition. Johnston's vocal range is classified as an acuto sfogato, meaning she can reach above an F6 note. Indeed she can reach a "C" note in the seventh register, which is otherwise unheard from a coloratura sopranos. When she turned 21, Johnston moved to Prague for a vacancy at the State Opera, where she worked to perfect her coloratura capabilities. Her 2012 debut in Prague was as Queen of the Night in Mozart's The Magic Flute and as Adèle in Strauss's The Revenge of the Bat. She appeared for three seasons of Mozart's Don Giovanni as Zerlina at the Estates Theatre, Prague. Later she toured the Czech Republic, Slovakia, Asia and South America as a solo act, while acting as a mainstay for the annual Prague Film Festival until the arrival of the Coronavirus pandemic in 2020.

Although renowned for her stage roles, Johnston says her initial ambition was to star in musical theatre. She cites Mozart as her favourite composer.

Blessing
Having long desired to make a name for herself in England, Christina Johnston officially released her first album in September 2017. Entitled Blessing, it features recordings by the City of Prague Philharmonic Orchestra and Chorus. British producer James Fitzpatrick produced it for Tadlow Music. Reportedly, Johnston had dreamed of making a classical album since the age of 14. It has Johnston singing in nine different languages, including Occitan. The album was conducted by Richard Hein. It includes Mozart's "Der Holle Rache Kocht in Meinem Herzen", which has since become one of her regular items, as it allows her to sing notes in the sixth register. She then decided her ambition was to maximise the number of people for whom she sings. The album is currently ranked at 759,600th in CDs and Vinyl and 33,050th in Symphonies, on Amazon.com's bestseller rank.

Current life
Johnston was married on 17 October 2010 to Viacheslav Myachin, who is credited as executive producer on the Blessing album, along with Janet Fitzpatrick. Myachin, originally from Russia, moved to Prague to work for his family's furniture business, where Johnston joined him. In the year 2019, they began the process of relocating to the UK. Johnston's mother Gillian continues to live in Suffolk.

Having lost her paid work due to the pandemic, Johnston has performed a series of "lockdown" concerts from her home in Suffolk, with help from her husband. Those performed most recently have included Johnston's selected vocal renditions of tracks from Evita, Moulin Rouge, The Greatest Showman and Phantom of the Opera. These appear on Johnston's Facebook page and on her YouTube channel.

References

External links

Former official website archived on 2017-06-11

1987 births
Living people
English operatic sopranos
People from Framlingham
21st-century British  women opera singers